Michael J. Obuchowski (born February 4, 1952) is a former member of the Vermont House of Representatives.  Elected at age 20 in 1972, he won reelection 19 times, serving continuously from January, 1973 until resigning in January, 2011 to accept appointment as Vermont's Buildings and General Services Commissioner.  Obuchowski served as Speaker from 1995 to 2001.

Biography
Michael John (Obie) Obuchowski was born in Bellows Falls, Vermont on February 4, 1952.  He graduated from Bellows Falls High School in 1970 and attended Harvard University for two years.

A Democrat, in 1972 Obuchowski was elected to the Vermont House of Representatives.  He also  began a full-time career as Assistant to the President of Basketville, a Putney business specializing in handmade baskets and other woven products for national and international retailers.

Obuchowski was elected every two years through 2010, and held office until resigning in January, 2011 to join the administration of Peter Shumlin as Commissioner of the Department of Buildings and General Services.  At 38 years, his tenure is the longest in the history of the Vermont House.

During Obuchowski's career he served as Chairman of the House Committees on Education, Energy, Commerce, Ways and Means, and Appropriations.  In addition, he served as Chairman of the Vermont General Assembly's Joint Energy, Transportation Oversight, Telecommunications Study, and Fiscal Committees.

In 1995 Obuchowski was named Speaker of the House, succeeding Ralph G. Wright, who had been defeated for reelection to his House seat.  He served until 2001, when Republicans gained enough seats to become the majority party in the House.

After Peter Shumlin won the race for Governor in 2010, he named Vermont State Treasurer Jeb Spaulding as Secretary of Administration.  Obuchowski was considered for appointment to the vacant Treasurer's position, and ultimately accepted appointment as Buildings and General Services Commissioner.  In December 2016, Governor-elect Phil Scott announced that Christopher Cole, who had previously served as Vermont's transportation secretary, was his choice to succeed Obuchowski.

Personal
Obuchowski is married to attorney and lobbyist Clare Buckley, and they are the parents of twins Jack and Nora.

References 

1952 births
Living people
People from Bellows Falls, Vermont
Speakers of the Vermont House of Representatives
Democratic Party members of the Vermont House of Representatives